Maupin is an unincorporated community in Franklin County, in the U.S. state of Missouri.

History
A post office called Maupin was established in 1896, and remained in operation until 1942. The community took its name from nearby Maupin Creek.

References

Unincorporated communities in Franklin County, Missouri
Unincorporated communities in Missouri